The 2013 Saint Francis Red Flash football team represented Saint Francis University in the 2013 NCAA Division I FCS football season. They were led by fourth year head coach Chris Villarrial and played their home games at DeGol Field. They were a member of the Northeast Conference. They finished the season 5–6, 3–3 in NEC play to finish in a three way tie for third place.

Schedule

Source: Schedule

References

Saint Francis
Saint Francis Red Flash football seasons
Saint Francis Red Flash football